William John Gies (February 21, 1872 – May 20, 1956) was a US biochemist and dentist.

Gies was born in Reisterstown, Maryland. He made Bachelor of Science at Gettysburg College in 1893 and Ph.D. at Yale University in 1897.

In 1899 he started teaching at Columbia University. He co-founded the School of Dentistry at Columbia, leading to the creation of the American Association of Dental Schools. He published a landmark report in 1926 on Dental Education in the US and Canada.

External links
 Picture and biography
 About Gies' report on dental education, 1926

1872 births
1956 deaths
American biochemists
Yale University alumni
People from Reistertown, Maryland
American dentists
Gettysburg College alumni
Columbia University faculty